Muar Dalam was a federal constituency in Johor, Malaysia, that was represented in the Dewan Rakyat from 1959 to 1974.

History
Muar Dalam was abolished in 1974 when it was redistributed. The new Pagoh federal constituency was then created from parts of the Muar Dalam constituency in the 1974 redistribution and was mandated to return a single member to the Dewan Rakyat under the first-past-the-post voting system.

Representation history

State constituency

Election results

References

Defunct Johor federal constituencies
Muar District